Wyoming Correctional Facility is a medium-security state men's prison in Town of Attica, Wyoming County, New York. The prison is located adjacent to the better-known maximum security Attica Correctional Facility. The Wyoming prison first opened in 1984. As of 2010 Wyoming had a working capacity of 1722 inmates.

The notorious Attica Prison riot took place in September 1971, thirteen years prior to the construction of the Wyoming prison, in the now adjacent Attica prison. All but four of the 43 men who died in the Attica event, including 10 hostages, were killed by law enforcement gunfire.

References

External links 
  Wyoming Correctional Facility webpage

Prisons in New York (state)
Buildings and structures in Wyoming County, New York
1984 establishments in New York (state)